The Roman Catholic Diocese of Taiohae (or Tefenuaenata, or Hakapehi) (Latin: Dioecesis Taiohaënus seu Humanae Telluris; French: Diocèse de Taiohae ou Tefenuaenata), in French Polynesia, is a suffragan diocese in the ecclesiastical province of the Roman Catholic Archdiocese of Papeete, yet still depends on the missionary Roman Congregation for the Evangelization of Peoples.

Its cathedral episcopal see is the Cathédrale Notre-Dame des Îles Marquises, dedicated to Mary, mother of Jesus at Taiohae, on Nuku Hiva, Marquesas Islands (French: îles Marquises).

History 
 Erected on 1848.05.09 as the Apostolic Vicariate of Marquesas Islands/ Isole Marchesi (Curiate Italian) / Insularum Marchesi (Latin), on insular territory split off from the suppressed Apostolic Vicariate of Eastern Oceania  
 Promoted on 1966.06.21 as Diocese of Taiohae / Taiohaën(us) (Latin)
 Renamed 1974.05.31 as Diocese of Taiohae / Hakapehi (synonym) / Tefenuaenata (Marquesan Islands name) / Humanæ Telluris (Latin) / Taiohaën(us) (Latin adjective).

Statistics 
As per 2014, it pastorally served 8,970 Catholics (91.2% of 9,835 total) on 1,250 km² in 26 parishes with 4 priests (2 diocesan, 2 religious), 11 lay religious (7 brothers, 4 sisters) and 1 seminarian.

Bishops 
(all Roman Rite, so far European:French missionaries)

Ordinaries
Apostolic Vicars of Marquesas Islands 
 François Baudichon, SS.CC. (1848.05.09 – retired 1855), Titular Bishop of Basilinopolis (1844.08.14 – 1882.06.11); died 1882 
 René Ildefonse Dordillon, SS.CC. (1855.12.07 – death 1888.01.11), Titular Bishop of Cambysopolis (1855.12.07 – 1888.01.11) 
Apostolic Administrator Father Rogatien-Joseph Martin, SS.CC. (1890.04.11 – 1892.06.03 see below), no previous prelature
 Rogatien-Joseph Martin, SS.CC. (see above 1892.06.03 – death 1912.05.27), Titular Bishop of Verinopolis (1892.06.03 – 1912.05.27)
 Pierre-Marie-David Le Cadre, Picpus Fathers (SS.CC.) (1920.12.30 – death 1952.11.21), Titular Bishop of Demetrias (1921.01.05 – 1952.11.21)
 Louis-Bertrand Tirilly, SS.CC. (1953.11.16 – 1966.06.21 see below), Titular Bishop of Buthrotum (1953.11.16 – 1966.06.21)Suffragan Bishops of Taiohae Louis-Bertrand Tirilly, SS.CC. (see above'' 1966.06.21 – retired 1970.03.17), emeritate as Titular Bishop of Budua (1970.03.17 – resigned 1976.09.27); died 2002 
 Hervé Le Cléac'h, SS.CC. (1973.03.01 – retired 1986.05.31), died 2012
 Guy Chevalier, SS.CC. (1986.05.31 – retired 2015.09.05), Bishop Emeritus; succeeded as previous Coadjutor Bishop of Taiohae (1985.03.29 – 1986.05.31)
 Pascal Chang-Soï, SS.CC. (5 September 2015 - ...), previously Coadjutor Bishop of Taiohae (French Polynesia) (2010.08.04 – succession 2015.09.05) and Apostolic Administrator of Papeete (French Polynesia) (2013.03.13 – 2015.08.28).

Coadjutor bishops
Guy André Dominique Marie Chevalier, SS.CC. (1985-1986)
Pascal Chang-Soï, SS.CC. (2010-2015)

See also 
 List of Catholic dioceses in South Pacific Conference states

Sources and external links 
 GCatholic, with Google map & satellite photo - data for all sections
 

Catholic Church in French Polynesia
Roman Catholic dioceses in French Polynesia
Marquesas Islands
Roman Catholic Ecclesiastical Province of Papeete